The Trocadero Theatre (opened as the Arch Street Opera House) is a historic theater located in Chinatown in  Philadelphia, Pennsylvania. It offered musical comedies, vaudeville, opera, and burlesque. The Trocadero Theatre was refurbished for use as an art house cinema and fine arts theatre in 1970s, and by the 1990s had become an iconic venue for rock and punk concerts.

History

The theater, designed by architect Edwin Forrest Durang, then modified several times, was added to the Philadelphia Register of Historic Places in 1973, and to the National Register of Historic Places five years later.

The building was known at various time as the Arch Street Opera House (1870–1879); Park Theatre (1879); New Arch Street Opera House (1884); Continental Theatre (1889); Gaiety Theatre (1890); Casino/Palace Theatre (1892), Troc Theatre (1940); Slocum's and Sweatman's Theatre; Sweatman's Arch Street Opera House; Simmon's & Slocum's Theatre; and Simmon's Theatre. It was already referred to as the Trocadero Theater in 1908.

The Trocadero was a burlesque theater from the early 1900s until the 1970s. Burlesque performer Mara Gaye performed here in the 1950s.

The Pennsylvania Opera Theater, in 1982, was presenting three productions a year at the Trocadero.

In 1986, the Trocadero was again remodeled for its current use as a concert hall and dance club. The Trocadero retains a promoting team and books bands directly. It has a capacity of 1,200 patrons (standing room) or 600 patrons (fully seated). The theater hosts a wide range of events including movie screenings, comedy shows, burlesque and concerts from alternative, indie rock, heavy metal, punk rock, jam, industrial/gothic bands, and hip hop and electronica artists. Bob Dylan performed at the Troc on December 11, 1997.

After several days of rumors and a last-minute attempt by local promoters to save it, Philadelphia's Trocadero Theatre, part of the city's entertainment skyline since 1870, closed in May 2019.

In October 2022 it was announced that Northwest Arch LLC, the group shown to legally own the Trocadero, had applied for and subsequently received a $2.5M state-issued grant through Pennsylvania's Redevelopment Assistance Capital Program. Plans were announced soon thereafter that the theater would be undergoing a "complete renovation of the exterior and interior of the Trocadero building. The end product will be a fully updated first-class concert venue, entertainment space and full-service restaurant." No immediate timeframe was given for commencement or completion of the renovations.

Recordings and broadcasts
A concert at the Trocadero was released by Combat Records as Ultimate Revenge 2 in 1989, featuring performances by bands Raven, Death, Forbidden, Dark Angel, and Faith or Fear.

A number of DVD and television specials have been filmed at the Trocadero, including the MTV program 2 Dollar Bill for My Chemical Romance in September 2006, comedian and actor Christian Finnegan's DVD/Comedy Central special Au Contraire in October 2008, comedian and actor Michael Ian Black's DVD/Comedy Central special Very Famous in March 2011, and comedian Dan Soder's Comedy Central special in December 2015.

The Dead Milkmen recorded their live album, Chaos Rules: Live at the Trocadero, at the Troc. In 1991, Tesla had a hit single with the live cover version of the Five Man Electrical Band song "Signs", which was recorded at the Troc.

The Trocadero was the location for Lamb of God's live DVD Killadelphia and for Job for a Cowboy's "Altered From Catechization" music video.

On June 2, 2012, professional wrestling promotion Chikara held the Chikarasaurus Rex: How to Hatch a Dinosaur internet pay-per-view at the Trocadero. Chikara held their next two pay-per-views, Under the Hood on December 2, 2012, and Aniversario: Never Compromise on June 2, 2013, at the venue.

See also

Chestnut Cabaret

External links

Trocadero Theater, Encyclopedia of Greater Philadelphia
Information at CinemaTreasures.com
Historic photographs at Philadelphia Architects and Buildings
Listing and photographs at the Historic American Buildings Survey

References

Music venues in Philadelphia
Nightclubs in Pennsylvania
Theatres on the National Register of Historic Places in Philadelphia
Chinatown, Philadelphia
1870 establishments in Pennsylvania
Opera houses on the National Register of Historic Places